Jean-Baptiste Grange (born 10 October 1984) is a French retired World Cup alpine ski racer. He competed primarily in slalom and earlier also in giant slalom and combined.

Born in Saint-Jean-de-Maurienne, Savoie, Grange grew up in Valloire, Galibier, and made his World Cup debut at age 19 in January 2004. In February 2007, he won the bronze medal in the slalom at the 2007 World Championships in Åre, Sweden. He won his first World Cup race on 17 December 2007, and won the 2009 season title in the slalom. Injured in early December 2009 in a giant slalom at Beaver Creek, he opted for surgery and missed the remainder of the 2010 season, which included the 2010 Winter Olympics. He returned to competition for the 2011 season and won the world championship in the slalom. He won his second slalom world title in Beaver Creek on 15 February 2015.

His older brother is François-Cyrille Grange, also an alpine ski racer.

World Cup results

Season standings

Standings through 21 March 2021

Season titles

Race podiums
 9 wins – (8 SL, 1 AC) 
 18 podiums – (15 SL, 3 AC)

World Championship results

Olympic results

References

External links
 
 Jean-Baptiste Grange World Cup standings at the International Ski Federation
 
 
  – 
 French Ski Team – 2016 men's A team – 
 Fischer Skis – athletes – Jean-Baptiste Grange

1984 births
Living people
People from Saint-Jean-de-Maurienne
French male alpine skiers
Olympic alpine skiers of France
FIS Alpine Ski World Cup champions
Alpine skiers at the 2006 Winter Olympics
Alpine skiers at the 2014 Winter Olympics
Alpine skiers at the 2018 Winter Olympics
Sportspeople from Savoie